The Transcontinental Airway System was a navigational aid deployed in the United States during the 1920s.

History 

In 1923, the United States Congress funded a sequential lighted airway along the transcontinental airmail route. The lighted airway was proposed by National Advisory Committee for Aeronautics (NACA), and deployed by the Department of Commerce. It was managed by the Bureau of Standards Aeronautical Branch. The first segment built was between Chicago and Cheyenne, Wyoming. It was situated in the middle of the airmail route to enable aircraft to depart from either coast in the daytime, and reach the lighted airway by nightfall. Lighted emergency airfields were also funded along the route every 15–20 miles.

Construction pace was fast, and pilots wishing to become airmail pilots were first exposed to the harsh wintertime work with the crews building the first segments of the lighting system.

By the end of the year, the public anticipated anchored lighted airways across the Atlantic, Pacific, and to China.

The first nighttime airmail flights started on July 1, 1924. By eliminating the transfer of mail to rail cars at night, the coast to coast delivery time for airmail was reduced by two business days. Eventually, there were 284 beacons in service. With a June 1925  deadline, the 2,665 mile lighted airway was completed from New York to San Francisco. In 1927, the lighted airway was complete between New York City and Salt Lake City, Los Angeles to Las Vegas, Los Angeles to San Francisco, New York to Atlanta, and Chicago to Dallas, 4121 miles in total. In 1933, the Transcontinental Airway System totaled 1500 beacons, and 18000 miles

Technical 

The lighted Airway Beacons were a substantial navigation aid in an era prior to the development of radio navigation. However, their effectiveness was limited by visibility and weather conditions.

The spacing was closer in the mountains, and farther apart in the plains. The beacons were five million candlepower, and rotated six times a minute. "Ford beacons" (named after Ford Car headlights) were also used, placing four separate lights at different angles.
Airports used green beacons and airways used red beacons. The beacons flashed identification numbers in Morse code. The sequence was "WUVHRKDBGM", which prompted the mnemonic "When Undertaking Very Hard Routes Keep Directions By Good Methods". Engineers believed the variations of beacon height along hills and valleys would allow pilots to see beacons both above ground fog, and below cloud layers.

Towers were built of numbered angle iron sections with concrete footings. Some facilities used concrete arrows pointing in the direction of towers. In areas where no connection to a power grid was available, a generator was housed in a small building. Some buildings also served as weather stations. Many arrow markings were removed during World War II, to prevent aiding enemy bombers in navigation. Nineteen updated beacons remained in service in Montana until 2018, maintained by the Montana Department of Transportation's Aviation Division.

Gallery

References

External links

A comprehensive map of airway beacons with downloadable beacon data   The Survey Station
Concrete Arrows and the U.S. Airmail Beacon System.   Sometimes Interesting. 04 Dec 2013
 "Arrows Across America; Transcontinental Air Mail Routes"

Air traffic control
Aviation history of the United States